Anita "Margarita" Mahfood (died 31 December 1965) was a dancer, actress, and singer in Jamaica. She was called "the famous Rhumba queen" and headlined performances. She also performed reggae music, writing and singing her own music, one of the first women in Jamaica to do so. Mahfood was murdered on New Year's Day in 1965 by her boyfriend Don Drummond of the Skatalites band.

Early life

Mahfood was born in Kingston, Jamaica. She had three sisters. Her father was Jad Mahfood, a fisherman. Her family were Lebanese-Jamaican, with ancestors who emigrated from Lebanon to Jamaica in the 1870s to pursue commercial trade.

Music, life and death

She lived in east Kingston, on Ocean View Avenue. She was married to Ruldolph Bent, a boxer from Belize. She had two children with Bent, Christopher and Suzanne.

Starting in the 1950s, Mahfood was a regular in the clubs in Kingston. She frequently performed as a dancer with Count Ossie, who backed her during her dance performances. Mahfood was scheduled to dance as part of "Opportunity Knocks", a talent showcase at the Ward Theatre in Kingston. Promoter Vere Johns refused to let Count Ossie back up Mahfood because he was a Rastafarian. Discrimination of this kind was common during the 1950s. Mahfood refused to perform, knowing that if she did not appear Johns would have a lower attendance at the event. Johns eventually relented and Mahfood performed with Count Ossie and his band. The performance ended up being the first Count Ossie and his band ever had in front of a mainstream audience.

Saxophone player Ferdinand Gaynair said he also had a relationship with her.

In the early 1960s, Mahfood met Don Drummond, trombone player of the Skatalites, at Count Ossie's Rastafarian commune in the Wareika Hills. By the time they met, Drummond had schizophrenia and already self-checked himself into Bellevue Hospital in Kingston twice due to his mental health. Mahfood and her husband had divorced and she and Drummond started living together. Drummond was physically and mentally abusive to Mahfood. He was easily triggered, attacking her in front of bandmates.

Mahfood released the single Woman Come (also called Woman A Come) on Black Swan in 1964. The single featured the Skatalites as her backing band. The Rastafarian-influenced song is a love letter to Drummond.

On 31 December 1965, Drummond missed the Skatalite's New Year's Eve concert at La Parisienne in Harbour View, Jamaica, after Mahfood accidentally gave him the wrong medication. That night Mahfood was working at a club in Rockfort. When Mahfood returned home from work at 3:30 AM, Drummond attacked her. He stabbed her in the chest four times, killing her instantly. Drummond went to the local police station and claimed that Mahfood had stabbed herself. When they arrived at the house, Mahfood was dead on the bed, with the knife still in her body, and Mahfood's hand shoved inside the bell of Drummond's trombone. Drummond was arrested and represented by the Skatalites' manager. Drummond was found guilty but criminally insane and was committed to Bellevue Hospital, where he died in 1969.

Legacy

In 2013, Mahfood was honoured by the University of Technology, Jamaica, for her contributions to Jamaican music. In 2016, Herbie Miller gave a presentation on Drummond and Mahfood at the Jamaican Music Museum.

Discography
"Woman Come" (1964) on Black Swan records

Filmography
It Can Happen to You (1956)

Further reading
Miller, Herbie. "Brown Girl in the Ring: Margarita and Malungu". Caribbean Quarterly 53, no. 4 (2007): 47–110. Retrieved 18 January 2020.
Augustyn, Heather. Don Drummond: The Genius and Tragedy of the World's Greatest Trombonist. Jefferson: McFarland (2013). pp. 54–69. 
White, Timothy. Catch a Fire: The Life of Bob Marley. New York: Macmillan (2006). pp. 199–201.

References

External links

1965 deaths
Jamaican people of Lebanese descent
20th-century Jamaican women singers
Jamaican female dancers
Musicians from Kingston, Jamaica
Female murder victims
Jamaican reggae singers